Norboletone (former proposed brand name Genabol), or norbolethone, is a synthetic and orally active anabolic–androgenic steroid (AAS) which was never marketed. It was first developed in 1966 by Wyeth Laboratories and was investigated for use as an agent to encourage weight gain and for the treatment of short stature, but was never marketed commercially because of fears that it might be toxic. It subsequently showed up in urine tests on athletes in competition in the early 2000s.

Norboletone was found to have been brought to the market by the chemist Patrick Arnold, of the Bay Area Laboratory Co-operative (BALCO), an American nutritional supplement company. It is reputed to have been the active ingredient in the original formulation of the "undetectable" steroid formulation known as "The Clear" before being replaced by the more potent drug tetrahydrogestrinone.

In 2002, Don Catlin, the founder and then-director of the UCLA Olympic Analytical Lab, identified norboletone for the first time in an athlete's urine sample. In the same year, U.S. bicycle racer Tammy Thomas was caught using it and was banned from her sport. The following year, Catlin identified and developed a test for tetrahydrogestrinone (THG), the second reported designer anabolic sample—a key development in the BALCO Affair.

Norboletone is on the World Anti-Doping Agency's list of prohibited substances, and is therefore banned from use in most major sports.

References 

Abandoned drugs
Androgens and anabolic steroids
Estranes
Designer drugs
Hepatotoxins
World Anti-Doping Agency prohibited substances